The black thrush (Turdus infuscatus) is a species of bird in the family Turdidae.  It was formerly known as the black robin. It is found in El Salvador, Guatemala, Honduras, and Mexico. Its natural habitat is subtropical or tropical moist montane forest.

References

black thrush
Birds of Mexico
Birds of Guatemala
Birds of Honduras
Birds of the Sierra Madre Oriental
black thrush
Taxonomy articles created by Polbot